Somerset Eagles is a football club from Sandys, Bermuda. They play in the Bermudian First Division.

History
Eagles have never won the league title and were on the losing side in the Bermuda FA Cup final twice, in 2010 and 2013. In March 2016 they won the Bermudian First Division title to win promotion to the Bermudian Premier Division. They had been in the second tier since their relegation in March 2011.

Historical list of coaches

  Marc Bean
  Kenny Thompson (- Jul 2010)
  Marlon Rojas (Aug 2010–present)

References

External links
 Club page – Bermuda FA

Football clubs in Bermuda
Sandys Parish